René Chaloult (January 26, 1901 – December 20, 1978) was a nationalist politician in Quebec, Canada.

Background

He was born on January 26, 1901, in Quebec City.

Political career

Chaloult first won a seat to the Legislative Assembly of Quebec as a Union Nationale candidate in the 1936 election in the district of Kamouraska.  In 1937, he and colleagues Oscar Drouin, Joseph-Ernest Grégoire, Philippe Hamel and Adolphe Marcoux left the Union Nationale.  Chaloult joined the Liberals and won re-election in the 1939 election as the Member for the district of Lotbinière.

During World War II, Chaloult opposed conscription.

He won re-election as an Independent in Québec-Comté electoral district in the 1944 and 1948 elections, but was defeated in the 1952 election and in the district of Jonquière-Kénogami in the 1956 election.

Chaloult retired to live at his summer home in Kamouraska. Each year on July 1, he would fly the Quebec flag outside his summer home at half-staff to show his nationalist inclinations.

Death

He died on December 20, 1978.

Legacy
For many years, Chaloult urged Quebec to adopt a distinctive design for its flag. On November 19, 1946, Chaloult entered a motion to provide Quebec with a unique flag. Two years later, the motion was to be voted on January 21, 1948. However, the opportunistic government of Maurice Duplessis instead issued a decree creating the current Quebec flag.

Footnotes

1901 births
1978 deaths
French Quebecers
Politicians from Quebec City
Quebec Liberal Party MNAs
Union Nationale (Quebec) MNAs
Université Laval alumni
Flag designers